Beautiful World is a 2019 South Korean television series starring Park Hee-soon, Choo Ja-hyun, Oh Man-seok, Cho Yeo-jeong, Nam Da-reum and Kim Hwan-hee. It aired on JTBC from April 5 to May 25, 2019.

Synopsis
The series follows the story of a boy who becomes critically injured due to an incident of school violence and his family who seeks the truth and fights for justice in his name.

Cast

Main
 Park Hee-soon as Park Moo-jin
 A high school physics teacher.
 Choo Ja-hyun as Kang In-ha
 Moo-jin's wife who runs a bakery named after their children.
 Oh Man-seok as Oh Jin-pyo
 The chairman of a private school foundation.
 Cho Yeo-jeong as Seo Eun-joo
 Jin-pyo's wife who is from a wealthy family.
 Nam Da-reum as Park Sun-ho
 Moo-jin and In-ha's son who is a third year middle school student when he becomes a victim of school violence.
 Kim Hwan-hee as Park Su-ho
 Sun-ho's younger sister who attends the same school.

Supporting
 Hwang Tae-kwang as Lee Sang-woo
 A rich man who inherited a fortune from his parents.
 Seo Young-joo as Han Dong-soo
 A boy who lives without hope for the future in an unfortunate environment.
 Lee Jae-in as Han Dong-hee
 Dong-soo little sister.
 Seo Dong-hyun as Oh Joon-seok
 Jin-pyo and Eun-joo's son.
 Lee Ji-hyun as Lim Sook-hee
 Yang Han-yeol as Lee Ki-chan

Viewership

Notes

References

External links
  
 
 

JTBC television dramas
Korean-language television shows
2019 South Korean television series debuts
2019 South Korean television series endings